Leif Andreas Larsen DSO, DSC, CGM, DSM and Bar (9 January 1906 – 12 October 1990), popularly known as "Shetlands Larsen", was a highly decorated Norwegian sailor. He was arguably the most famous of the men who operated the Shetland bus escape route during the war.

He participated as a volunteer on the Finnish side during the Winter War and was a soldier in the defence of Norway following the German invasion at Kongsvinger Fortress. He had excellent leadership skills; one of the British officers at the Shetland base, David Howarth, described him as "one of the most remarkable personalities of the entire Second World War". Larsen preferred to downplay his own role and instead named his crew as the reason for his achievements.

Shetland bus 
Larsen dramatically escaped Norway in February 1941 in the fishing boat MOTIG 1, a voyage he recounted in his autobiography. He then joined the "Norwegian Naval Independent Unit", an unwieldy cover title far better known as the Shetland bus. The unit, which operated under the Special Operations Executive (SOE) was, despite its name, initially independent of the regular Royal Norwegian Navy. He trained with the Linge Company.

He was the skipper of the fishing vessel Arthur during an attempt to sink the German battleship Tirpitz in the Trondheimsfjord in the fall of 1942 (Operation Title). Despite the raid's failure, Larsen received a Conspicuous Gallantry Medal, the first non-Briton to do so. The Admiralty records the operation as "the achievement of penetrating to within  of the berth occupied by the Tirpitz represents, on the part of the personnel and particularly that of the Norwegians, a fine example of cold-blooded courage."

Boat skippers were initially given the nominal rank of petty officer ('quartermaster'), but Larsen was later, without a great deal of enthusiasm, given a formal commission as a Sub-lieutenant (Norwegian: fenrik) in the Royal Norwegian Navy. This explains how Larsen received his unusual array of British medals, including two normally only given to privates, as well as two normally only given to officers.

In all he made 52 trips to Norway in ordinary fishing boats.

Operations became increasingly dangerous as the war progressed and the German forces improved their air and sea defences. They began to understand the true role of fishing-boats operating far from the coast and the fishing boats were phased out in favour of three American 'sub-chasers', which were much larger, faster and better-armed, altogether better suited to the changed circumstances. The commanders of these three vessels were required to be commissioned officers and Larsen became the captain of the HNoMS Vigra.

Honours and awards 
With eleven orders, Larsen became one of the most highly decorated naval officers of the Second World War. No other man, British or foreign, received the same British military honours. In addition to the array of British decorations, he was awarded Norway's highest decoration for military gallantry, Krigskorset med Sverd or the War Cross with sword twice, in 1942 and 1943. He was one of only two people to receive this honour "The War Cross with Two Swords.

In 1995 a statue of him was erected by the sea in the centre of Bergen near the UNESCO site of Bryggen.
In 2000 the Bergen newspaper Bergens Tidende named Larsen Vestlandet's man of the century.
His medals are on display in The North Sea Traffic Museum in Telavåg.

Post-war 

After the war Larsen had a major role in organising the naval branch of the Norwegian Home Guard.

In 1947, the Norwegian author Frithjof Sælen published the book Shetlands-Larsen about Leif Larsen. The book was published in the United Kingdom under the title None but the Brave, and in France under the title Mission Suicide.

In 1954 Leif Larsen played himself in the movie Shetlandsgjengen (released as Suicide Mission in the United States). The film was based on Frithjof Sælen's book and historian David Howarth's book The Shetland Bus.

Larsen died from a stroke at the age of 84 in Bergen, Norway, on 12 October 1990. He was survived by his wife and three daughters.

References

External links 

 
 A page on mini subs during World War II 

1906 births
1990 deaths
Norwegian Army personnel of World War II
Norwegian Special Operations Executive personnel
Royal Norwegian Navy personnel of World War II
People associated with Shetland
Companions of the Distinguished Service Order
Recipients of the Distinguished Service Cross (United Kingdom)
Recipients of the Conspicuous Gallantry Medal
Recipients of the St. Olav's Medal with Oak Branch
Recipients of the Distinguished Service Medal (United Kingdom)
Recipients of the War Cross with Sword (Norway)
Recipients of the Medal of Freedom
Volunteers in the Winter War
Military history of Scotland
Norwegian expatriates in Finland